Marriott-Slaterville is a city in Weber County, Utah, United States. The population was 1,701 at the 2010 census. It is part of the Ogden–Clearfield, Utah Metropolitan Statistical Area. The city was incorporated in July 1999, in a merger of the previously unincorporated communities of Marriott and Slaterville.

Geography

History
Marriott-Slaterville City was originally settled by several Latter Day Saint pioneer families, in 1852, including the Richard Slater family, and the Perry, Smout, Marriott, and Field families. Many living descendants of these families, including relatives of J. Willard Marriott, pioneer hotelier of the 20th century and founder of Marriott International, still reside within Marriott-Slaterville.

Demographics

As of the census of 2000, there were 1,425 people, 458 households, and 381 families residing in the city. The population density was 196.4 people per square mile (75.8/km2). There were 471 housing units at an average density of 64.9 per square mile (25.0/km2). The racial makeup of the city was 96.14% White, 0.21% Native American, 0.49% Asian, 0.07% Pacific Islander, 2.11% from other races, and 0.98% from two or more races. Hispanic or Latino of any race were 3.37% of the population.

There were 458 households, out of which 38.4% had children under the age of 18 living with them, 70.1% were married couples living together, 7.9% had a female householder with no husband present, and 16.6% were non-families. 14.2% of all households were made up of individuals, and 6.3% had someone living alone who was 65 years of age or older. The average household size was 3.11 and the average family size was 3.43.

In the city, the population was spread out, with 29.4% under the age of 18, 10.7% from 18 to 24, 25.9% from 25 to 44, 23.1% from 45 to 64, and 10.9% who were 65 years of age or older. The median age was 34 years. For every 100 females, there were 102.1 males. For every 100 females age 18 and over, there were 105.7 males.

The median income for a household in the city was $49,732, and the median income for a family was $57,083. Males had a median income of $41,466 versus $27,788 for females. The per capita income for the city was $19,534. About 5.9% of families and 7.3% of the population were below the poverty line, including 6.4% of those under age 18 and 8.5% of those age 65 or over.

Federal Representation 
Marriott-Slaterville is located in Utah's First Congressional District
For the 116th United States Congress, Utah's First Congressional District is represented by Rob Bishop ((R) Brigham City)

See also

 List of cities and towns in Utah

References

External links

 

Cities in Utah
Cities in Weber County, Utah
Ogden–Clearfield metropolitan area
1999 establishments in Utah
Populated places established in 1999